The following is a list of schools in Southern Province, Sri Lanka.

Galle District

National schools

Provincial schools

Private schools

International schools

Special Schools

Hambantota District

National schools

Provincial schools

International schools

Sun-Ray International College,Ambalantota

Special schools

Matara District

National schools

Provincial schools

Private schools

International schools

Special schools

References

 
Southern Province